Jesus Is Born is the debut studio album by American gospel group Sunday Service Choir, with American rapper Kanye West acting as executive producer. It was released on December 25, 2019, through INC. The album was released to coincide with Christmas and follows the release of West's Christian-themed ninth studio album Jesus Is King, which was released two months prior in October 2019.

West announced the release date of Jesus Is Born the day before Jesus Is King was released, with the group's choir director Jason White later confirming the release. The former received generally positive reviews from music critics, who often commented on West's involvement. The album charted at number 73 and two on the US Billboard 200 and US Top Gospel Albums charts, respectively.

Background and recording

On the first Sunday of 2019, West began the first "Sunday Service" rehearsal, where he performed gospel arrangements of songs from his discography and other songs with choir group The Samples and frequent collaborators such as Tony Williams and Ant Clemons. In April 2019, West has claimed that he was "radically saved" around the time of the group's first public performance at the Coachella Valley Music and Arts Festival. West's ninth studio album Jesus Is King was released in October 2019, with Sunday Service providing featured vocals on the track "Every Hour" and additional vocals on "Selah", "Everything We Need" and "Water".

Release and promotion
In a pre-recorded promotional interview with Zane Lowe released a day before West's album Jesus Is King, the rapper announced that a Sunday Service album entitled Jesus Is Born would be released on December 25, 2019 to coincide with Christmas. It was later confirmed that the album would be released on that date at a special Christmas Eve edition of Sunday Service by the group's leader Jason White, with him doing so while addressing the audience. A video was shared by Complex that shows Sunday Service in the studio with a note marking the Christmas release. On December 25, 2019, Jesus Is Born was released for digital download and streaming by INC. The album's release differentiated from the release of Jesus Is King due to it undergoing no delays. The music tech company Vydia quickly and cleanly distributed the album to streaming services in less than 24 hours. West tweeted a link of where Jesus Is Born is available for streaming on December 25, 2019, accompanying the link with the album's cover art. Though the album is credited to the Sunday Service Choir, Forbes, CNN and Entertainment Weekly consider Jesus Is Born to be part of West's album discography.

Critical reception

Jesus Is Born was met with generally positive reviews from music critics. At Metacritic, the album received an average score of 74, based on five reviews. Aggregator AnyDecentMusic? gave Jesus Is Born 6.5 out of 10, based on their assessment of the critical consensus.

NMEs Rhian Daly described the album as "a record that is gospel through-and-through, with no quantifying statements necessary" and opined that it is not essential to "believe in a higher being or have any interest in gospel music" to appreciate the album. In Billboard, Bianca Gracie praised the album for focusing more on the choir than Jesus Is King, while claiming that Jesus Is Born "builds upon West's immersive reawakening." Gracie also noted that the album "wouldn't be a Kanye West-led album without a few nods to his own discography" and wrote that it "balances heritage with millennial innovation." Shane Cashman from Pitchfork looked at the album as where West "assembled a massive choir to channel his Christian message in a joyous, all-consuming wave of sound" and viewed him as "using the choir as a living, breathing sampler," due to West selecting old songs to be recontextualized by the choir, despite the lack of any samples. Neil Z. Yeung of AllMusic viewed the album as being "imbued by the influences of traditional gospel predecessors" and claimed that West's "production touches can be subtly heard throughout," despite the lack of vocals from him.

Dean Van Nguyen was less enthusiastic in The Guardian, claiming that Jesus Is Born is not likable for those uninterested in the "religious rebirth" of West, though stated that "the album certainly fulfils its prayerful remit" and "is more full-bodied than its predecessor." In a mixed review, Daniel Bromfield of Spectrum Culture wrote that despite the absence of vocals from West on the album being refreshing, "the lack of his fingerprints is disappointing." Bromfield elaborated, noting that West "hasn't written any new songs" for the album and branded the content as "slim pickings."

Commercial performance
After a-day-and-a-half of tracking, Jesus Is Born debuted on the US Billboard Top Gospel Albums chart at number two. The album sold 6,000 album-equivalent units, 3,000 of which came from pure album sales, though it was held off the top spot by Jesus Is King with 10,000 units. The following week, the latter debuted at number 73 on the US Billboard 200, standing as the second highest entry of the week on the chart. That same week, Jesus Is Born sold 10,000 album-equivalent units and remained at number two on the US Top Gospel Albums chart; this was following its first full week of tracking. The album entered at number three on the UK Christian & Gospel Albums chart, one place behind Jesus Is King at number two.

Nine of Jesus Is Borns 19 tracks charted on the US Billboard Gospel Songs chart. This led to West's music taking up 20 of the 25 positions on the chart at once, including tracks released under his real name and by the Sunday Service Choir, respectively; the former of which are not included on the album. "Father Stretch" stood as the highest charting track from Jesus Is Born, reaching number ten on the US Gospel Songs chart, though music released under West's real name prevented the song from charting higher.

Track listing

Credits and personnel
Credits are adapted from Tidal and Instagram and may be incomplete because official liner notes for the album have not been released yet.

 Kanye West – executive production, production
 Nikki Grier – production, arrangement 
 Jason White – production, choir director, arrangement 
 Philip Cornish – production, music director, organ, keys, arrangement 
 Federico Vindver – production 
 Budgie – production 
 Steve Epting – arrangement 
 Jawan McEastland – arrangement 
 Jonathan E. Coleman – production coordinator, choir manager
The Samples "Sunday Service Choir"
 Adam Michael Wilson – choir
 Adriana N. Washington – choir
 Akua Willis – choir
 Alexander Jacke – choir
 Alexandria A. Arowora – choir
 Alexandria Simone Griffin – choir
 Alexis James – choir
 Alexis Jones – choir
 Alisha Roney – choir
 Amanda Adams – choir
 Amber M. Grant – choir
 Ameera Perkins – choir
 Andre M. Washington – choir
 Angela C. Williams – choir
 Angelle King – choir
 Anthony McEastland – choir
 Ashley Echols – choir
 Ashley Nichol – choir
 Ashley Washington – choir
 Ashly Williams – choir
 Bobby Musique Cooks – choir
 Bradley Morice Jones – choir
 Brandi JaNise Majors – choir
 Brandon Rodgers – choir
 Breenen Johnson – choir
 Brittany Jerita Wallace – choir
 Brooke Brewer – choir
 Bryan Austin Green – choir
 Caleb Minter – choir
 Carisa Dalton Moore – choir
 Carmel A. Echols – choir
 Cassandra Renee Grigsby Chism – choir
 Cedric Jackson II – choir
 Cedrit B. Leonard Jr. – choir
 Chadric R Johnson – choir
 Chara Hammonds – choir
 Chaz Mason – choir
 Chelsea B Miller – choir
 Chelsea West – choir
 Chimera Wilson – choir
 Claudia A. Cunningham – choir
 Corinthian Buffington – choir
 Crystal Butler McQueen – choir
 Curnita Turner – choir
 Daniel Devila – choir
 Daniel Ozan – choir
 Danielle E Deimler – choir
 Darius Coleman – choir
 Deanna Dixon – choir
 Deonis Cook – choir
 Derrick Evans – choir
 Desiree Washington – choir
 Destine Nelson – choir
 Devon Baker – choir
 Don Sykes – choir
 Donald Paige – choir
 Dwanna Orange – choir
 Emi Seacrest – choir
 Eric L. Copeland II – choir
 Erik Brooks – choir
 Estherlancia Mercado – choir
 Fallynn Rian Oliver – choir
 Fannie Belle Johnson – choir
 Felice LaZae Martin – choir
 Gabrielle Carreiro – choir
 George Hamilton – choir
 Herman Bryant III – choir
 India Moret – choir
 Isaiah Johnson – choir
 Isaiah Steven Jones – choir
 Jacquelyn M. Jones – choir
 Jaden Blakley Gray – choir
 Jamal Moore – choir
 Jasmine L Morrow – choir
 JaVonte Pollard – choir
 Jazmine Yvette Bailey – choir
 Jenelle Rose Dunkley – choir
 Jerel Duren – choir
 Jerome Wayne – choir
 JeRonelle McGhee – choir
 Jherimi Leigh Henry – choir
 Joel Echols – choir
 Johnny Lee Paddio Jr – choir
 Joy A. Love – choir
 Justin Hart – choir
 Kadeem S. Nichols – choir
 Kamili Mitchell – choir
 Keisha Renee Lewis – choir
 Kene Alexander – choir
 Kimberly A Jefferson – choir
 Kyrese Victoria Montgomery – choir
 LaMarcus Eldridge – choir
 Lanita Smith – choir
 Mariah Meshae Maxwell – choir
 Mark Justin-Paul Hood – choir
 Marqueta Pippens – choir
 Maurice Smith - choir
 Megan Parker – choir
 Melanie S. Tryggestad – choir
 Michael Shorts – choir
 Naarai Jacobs – choir
 Nikisha Grier-Daniels – choir
 Orlando Dotson – choir
 Porcha Clay – choir
 Princess Foster – choir
 Reesha Archibald – choir
 Rondez O. Rolle – choir
 Samantha N. Nelson – choir
 Sha’leah Nikole Stubblefield – choir
 Shana Andrews – choir
 Shanice Lorraine Knox – choir
 Sharon Marie Norwood – choir
 Shatisha Lawson – choir
 Steve Maurice Epting Jr – choir
 Synai Davis – choir
 Taelor Nevin Murphy – choir
 Tayler Green – choir
 Tickwanya Jones – choir
 Tiffanie Cross – choir
 Tiffany Stevenson – choir
 Vernon Burris Jr – choir
 William Harper – choir
 Zachary C. Moore – choir
 Paul Cornish – keys
 Nick Clark – bass
 Rico Nichols – drums
 Darius Woodley – drums
 Roland Gajate-Garci – drums
 Kyla Moscovich – horns
 Lasim Ahmed Richards – horns
 Marion Ross III – horns
 Cameron Johnson – horns
 Lemar Guillary – horns
 Chris Johnson – horns
 The Samples – choir
 Mike Dean – mixing
 Ant Clemons

Charts

Weekly charts

Year-end charts

Release history

References

External links
 Jesus Is Born at Discogs (list of releases)

2019 Christmas albums
2019 debut albums
Albums produced by Kanye West
Christmas albums by American artists
Gospel albums by American artists
Gospel Christmas albums
Kanye West albums
Self-released albums
Sequel albums
Christian hip hop albums